Melville "Mel" Aaron Rosser sometimes recorded as Melvin and Melvyn (18 April 1901 – 8 September 1988) was a Welsh international rugby centre who played rugby union for Penarth and Cardiff and later turned to professional rugby league joining first Leeds, then Castleford (Heritage #88), and then York. Rosser played international rugby for Wales under both union and league codes, and toured Australia with the Great Britain rugby league team in 1928.

Rugby union career
Mel Rosser began his rugby career with his local rugby club Machen RFC, before moving to first class team Cardiff. He played two seasons for Cardiff, scoring four tries during his period with the club. During the 1923–24 season, Rosser switched from Cardiff to local rival club Penarth. It was as a Penarth player that he was first selected for international duty, selected for Wales to face Scotland as part of the 1924 Five Nations Championship. Rosser was brought in at centre, partnered with Jack Elwyn Evans of Llanelli. The game was a sporting disaster, with Scotland inflicting their heaviest victory over Wales, and running up a record breaking score in a 35–10 win.

Although Rosser was dropped after the Scotland game, missing the encounter with Ireland, he was reselected for the final game of the Championship, away to France. Rosser was originally intended to play at centre, but on the train trip to Paris the Welsh selectors suspended Ossie Male as he had broken a rule preventing any player from representing Wales if they had played club rugby within the week leading up to the international match. With no other fullback aboard the train, Rosser was switched to an emergency fullback with reserve player Joe Jones drafted into the backs. It was a narrow win for Wales, with the victory coming thanks to a Vince Griffiths dropped goal.

During his rugby union career, Griffiths also represented Glamorgan County and as a serving police officer, he also played for Glamorgan Police.

International rugby union matches played
Wales
  1924
  1924

Rugby league career
At the start of the 1924/1925 season, Rosser turned his back on rugby union by joining professional rugby league club Leeds. At the same time he left the police force and became a licensee. He played his first game for Leeds on 6 September 1924, and on 12 April 1926 he was selected to play for the Wales national rugby league team, making him a dual-code international. The game was held at Pontypridd against England, and the Welsh lost narrowly despite scoring six tries and two goals. Rosser scoring one of the tries. He had to wait almost four years to record his second and Wales league cap, when he was selected to face Australia at Wembley in early 1930. Although Wales lost again, Rosser was again on the score sheet with another try. In between his two Wales caps for Leeds, Rosser also represented Great Britain on the team's 1928 tour of Australia. One of six Welsh players who went on the tour, he played in nine matches though none of the six Tests.

In the 1930/31 season, Rosser switched rugby clubs from Leeds to Castleford for one match, and then to York Football Club. While at York he represented Wales another three times, two games against England and another encounter with Australia. The Australian game was his last, played on 30 December 1930.

Mel Rosser played left-, i.e. number 4, in Monmouthshire's 14-18 defeat by Glamorgan in the non-County Championship match during the 1926–27 season at Taff Vale Park, Pontypridd on Saturday 30 April 1927.

Mel Rosser played right-, i.e. number 3, in York's 8-22 defeat by Halifax in the 1930–31 Challenge Cup Final during the 1930–31 season at Wembley Stadium, London on Saturday 2 May 1931, in front of a crowd of 40,368.

International rugby league matches played
Wales
  1926, 1931, 1932
  1930, 1933

Bibliography

References

External links
!Great Britain Statistics at englandrl.co.uk (statistics currently missing due to not having appeared for both Great Britain, and England)

1901 births
1988 deaths
Glamorgan Police officers
Cardiff RFC players
Castleford Tigers players
Dual-code rugby internationals
Glamorgan County RFC players
Glamorgan Police RFC players
Great Britain national rugby league team players
Leeds Rhinos players
Monmouthshire rugby league team players
Penarth RFC players
Publicans
Rugby league centres
Rugby league players from Caerphilly County Borough
Rugby union centres
Rugby union fullbacks
Rugby union players from Machen
Wales international rugby union players
Wales national rugby league team players
Welsh police officers
Welsh rugby league players
Welsh rugby union players
York Wasps players